Dunnville is an unincorporated community located near the mouth of the Grand River in Haldimand County, Ontario, Canada near the historic Talbot Trail. It was formerly an incorporated town encompassing the surrounding area with a total population of 12,000.

History
Dunnville was the site of a Cayuga settlement called Detgahnegaha'gó:wah. The European settlement was originally built as the entrance to the Welland "feeder" canal and the town once boasted several water-powered mills and a once-bustling canal port. The feeder canal closed in the late 1880s and the last mill was destroyed and replaced with a condominium complex about ten years ago. There is an impassable dam at Dunnville which regulates the level of the Grand River at Port Maitland which, in the 19th century, also helped regulate the level of the Welland Canal (from 1829 until 1887 when the third canal began to intake its water directly from Lake Erie). Dunnville was incorporated as a village in 1860 and then as a town in 1900. In 1974, the town amalgamated with the townships of Dunn, Canborough, Moulton and Sherbrooke when the Regional Municipality of Haldimand-Norfolk was formed. In 2001, Dunnville and all other municipalities within the region were dissolved and the region was divided into two single tier municipalities with city-status but called counties. What was the incorporated town of Dunnville now consists of Wards 5 and 6 in Haldimand County.

Only a few kilometres from Lake Erie, Dunnville has many private vacation properties.

There are many events and natural attractions. In June, the annual Mudcat Festival is held to celebrate one of the Grand River's most well-known inhabitants. The festival includes a parade, strongman contests, midway and fireworks. Another popular event is the Dunnville Agricultural Fair, held in late August which includes heavy, light and miniature horse shows, sheep and goat shows. Dunnville has tennis, golf and swimming facilities and many Bed and Breakfasts and camp sites to stay in. Tuesday and Saturday are Farmers Market days since the relocation of the local arena Dunnville is currently constructing a new Farmers Market Pavilion providing more protection from the elements while helping to support what the local farming has to offer (heating may still be an issue).

The former World War II RCAF Training Base, the Dunnville Airport, offers a unique window on history with its massive hangars and runways. Previously used for recreational flying and skydiving, the airport is now closed due to six large wind-turbine power generators on the airfield. The airport is also home to Haldimand County's newest museum, the No. 6 RCAF Dunnville Museum. It has also been the home of the Driver Rehabilitation Centre for the reality television program Canada's Worst Driver since 2010. The Grand River and nearby Lake Erie offers aquatic activities including swimming, sailing, windsurfing, canoeing and features prime locations for fishing. Nearby are Byng Island Conservation Area, Rock Point Provincial Park and Port Maitland's new pier. In the fall, Rock Point hosts thousands of monarch butterflies heading south. Dunnville is also the site of one of the largest expanses of provincially significant wetlands in Ontario; bird watching and nature photography are practised there. Smuckers Foods of Canada Co., which operates the Bick's Pickle Plant (Dunnville's largest factory), provides employment for a small percentage of the town's population, mainly students. In 2001, Bick's head office facility in Scarborough, Ontario was shut down and operations were transferred to the Dunnville location, where it remained until the end of November 2011, at which point it closed. This community is the easternmost city that belongs to the Green Energy Hub of Southern Ontario.

2009 Grand River flood
On February 13, 2009, the Grand River flooded when the river ice thawed, damaging Cayuga and Dunnville. The next day, the CCGC Griffon proceeded up the river to help clear ice.

Education
Public education is administered by the Grand Erie District School Board. Schools located in Dunville include:
 Dunnville Secondary School
 Mapleview Elementary School
 Thompson Creek Elementary School

Notable people
James N. Allan, politician
Ryan Barnes, hockey player
John Bowen, Bishop of Sierra Leone
Cory Conacher, Former National Hockey League (NHL) player for the Ottawa Senators
Peter DeBoer, NHL coach
David Fenyves, retired NHL player
W. A. Fry, Dunnville Chronicle publisher and president of the Ontario Hockey Association, Canadian Amateur Hockey Association and Amateur Athletic Union of Canada
Jim Gregory, Past General Manager for the Toronto Maple Leafs
Ryan Hayashi, magician
Nathan Horton, NHL player for the Toronto Maple Leafs
Matt Roik, professional lacrosse goaltender for the Washington Stealthy

See also

 List of unincorporated communities in Ontario

References

Communities in Haldimand County
Former towns in Ontario
Populated places on the Grand River (Ontario)
Populated places disestablished in 1974